Fluorescent Black is a studio album by American hip hop group Anti-Pop Consortium. It was released on Big Dada on September 28, 2009.

Critical reception

At Metacritic, which assigns a weighted average score out of 100 to reviews from mainstream critics, the album received an average score of 79, based on 13 reviews, indicating "generally favorable reviews".

John Bush of AllMusic gave the album 4.5 out of 5 stars, calling it "one of the best rap records of the year." Thomas Quinlan of Exclaim! said, "Fluorescent Black is an exciting, energetic return for a group long overdue for a new release, and it might just be the best Anti-Pop Consortium album to date." Adam Park of Clash gave the album an 8 out of 10, describing it as "a futuristic blueprint that will subtly define the coming decade's urban landscape."

Dan LeRoy of Dallas Observer included it on the "Best Hip-Hop of 2009" list.

Track listing

Personnel
Credits adapted from liner notes.

Anti-Pop Consortium
 Beans – vocals, production
 High Priest – vocals, production
 M. Sayyid – vocals, production
 Earl Blaize – production, engineering, mixing

Additional musicians
 Dolphin – guitar (1, 3, 12)
 MegMan – bass guitar (1, 3, 4), synthesizer (1, 6), production (11)
 Alter Ego – production (4)
 Celina Gray – vocals (4)
 Leslie Klyachman – vocals (4)
 Kristina Zubkova – vocals (4)
 Michael Figaro – vocals (6)
 David Nelson – vocals (9)
 La Sonya Gunter – vocals (9, 11, 12)
 Roots Manuva – vocals (10)
 Shawn Keys – keyboards (12), strings (12)
 Mr Live – vocals (15)

Technical personnel
 Dan Huron – recording (12, 17)
 Tony Dawsey – mastering
 Ron Croudy – design
 Mark Evans – illustration
 Timothy Saccenti – photography

References

External links
 

2009 albums
Antipop Consortium albums
Big Dada albums